Sandford Manor House is a Grade II* listed house in Rewell Street,  Fulham, London.

It was probably built in the late 17th century, but with later alterations and additions. It has been converted to offices.

The house is reputed to have been the residence of Nell Gwynne, the long-time mistress of King Charles II of England.

References

External links

History of the London Borough of Hammersmith and Fulham
Buildings and structures in the London Borough of Hammersmith and Fulham
Grade II* listed buildings in the London Borough of Hammersmith and Fulham
Grade II* listed houses
Houses in the London Borough of Hammersmith and Fulham
Houses completed in the 17th century